Edward Leon Sciaky (April 2, 1948–January 29, 2004) was an American rock radio disc jockey who spent his broadcasting career in the Philadelphia area.

Early life
He was born in New York City and raised in Philadelphia, where he graduated from Central High School, and then from Temple University where he majored in mathematics.

Career
Sciaky became known for promoting new talent, helping  establish the careers of scores of artists, most notably Bruce Springsteen, Billy Joel, David Bowie, Janis Ian, and Yes. Sciaky can also be heard introducing AC/DC on the Live from the Atlantic Studios CD off their 1997 boxset, Bonfire.

He was one of the first FM disc jockeys who thrived when given the chance to choose their own music, venturing beyond playing pop hits. Frequently, he would play lesser known songs that had personal meaning for himself or listeners. He was a good friend to many musicians who enjoyed his intelligent interviews and his knowledge of rock-n-roll. One of his best recording artist friends was Billy Joel, who at 23, had just released his Cold Spring Harbor album and was trying to promote it. Sciaky subsequently featured it on one his Sigma Sound broadcasts.

Sciaky provided the master tape of Yes's live version of The Beatles' "I'm Down" for the band's 1992 Yesyears box set.

Sciaky's broadcasting career, all in the Philadelphia area, covered WRTI, WHAT, WXUR (in Media; unrelated to the modern WXUR), WDAS, WMMR, WIOQ, WYSP, WMMR (again), and finally WMGK.

In 2003, Sciaky's "Sunday With Springsteen" specialty show won a "Best Of Philly" award from Philadelphia Magazine.

The Broadcast Pioneers of Philadelphia  posthumously inducted Sciaky into their Hall of Fame in 2005.

Personal life 
Sciaky lived on the Main Line, Philadelphia. His house was home to a substantial, well-organized music collection, as well as a rather large iguana, perhaps five feet long. The resting iguana would sometimes startle first time guests when it moved slightly and caught their attention.

He was married to Judy (Feldshur) Sciaky from 1969 until his death. They had one child in 1985, Monica, an opera singer with a doctorate in vocal arts, who married Eiki Isomura, who has his doctorate in conducting and is the son of world renowned violist Kazuhide Isomura.

Death
Sciaky died of complications from diabetes on January 29, 2004, at the age of 55. E Street drummer, Max Weinberg, and singer-songwriter, Steve Forbert, served as pallbearers at his funeral, which was attended by 1500 people.

References

1948 births
2004 deaths
American radio personalities
Radio personalities from Philadelphia